Fort Benton Bridge spans the Missouri River at the town of Fort Benton, Montana. It was built in 1888. It has also been known as Old Bridge and was listed on the National Register of Historic Places in 1980.

The bridge has five pin-connected truss spans. The longer span on the Fort Benton bank is a -long Camelback through truss bridge built after a 1908 flood destroyed a cantilevered swing span and its central pier.

See also
List of bridges documented by the Historic American Engineering Record in Montana

References

External links

Bridges completed in 1888
Historic American Engineering Record in Montana
National Register of Historic Places in Chouteau County, Montana
Road bridges on the National Register of Historic Places in Montana
Pratt truss bridges in the United States
Parker truss bridges in the United States
1888 establishments in Montana Territory
Bridges over the Missouri River
Transportation in Chouteau County, Montana